San Augustine County is a county located in the U.S. state of Texas. As of the 2020 census, its population was 7,918. Its county seat is San Augustine.

History
San Augustine County was formed in 1837. It was supposedly named after the Saint, Augustine of Hippo. However, it seems more plausible that the county was named for the town of San Augustine, which had been established five years earlier and whose name was based upon an 18th-century Spanish presidio (fortress), the Presidio de San Agustín de Ahumada, named for Agustín de Ahumada, 2nd Marquess of Amarillas.

Geography

Major highways
  U.S. Highway 96
  State Highway 21
  State Highway 103
  State Highway 147

Adjacent counties
 Shelby County (north)
 Sabine County (east)
 Jasper County (south)
 Angelina County (southwest)
 Nacogdoches County (west)

Protected areas
 Angelina National Forest (part)
 Sabine National Forest (part)
 Mission Dolores State Historic Site

Demographics

Note: the US Census treats Hispanic/Latino as an ethnic category. This table excludes Latinos from the racial categories and assigns them to a separate category. Hispanics/Latinos can be of any race.

As of the census of 2000, there were 8,946 people, 3,575 households, and 2,520 families residing in the county.  The population density was 17 people per square mile (7/km2).  There were 5,356 housing units at an average density of 10 per square mile (4/km2).  The racial makeup of the county was 69.26% White, 27.95% Black or African American, 0.20% Native American, 0.20% Asian, 1.64% from other races, and 0.75% from two or more races.  3.58% of the population were Hispanic or Latino of any race.

There were 3,575 households, out of which 26.80% had children under the age of 18 living with them, 53.50% were married couples living together, 13.50% had a female householder with no husband present, and 29.50% were non-families. 27.00% of all households were made up of individuals, and 14.90% had someone living alone who was 65 years of age or older.  The average household size was 2.43 and the average family size was 2.93.

In the county, the population was spread out, with 23.70% under the age of 18, 6.80% from 18 to 24, 23.00% from 25 to 44, 25.10% from 45 to 64, and 21.40% who were 65 years of age or older.  The median age was 42 years. For every 100 females there were 92.10 males.  For every 100 females age 18 and over, there were 85.90 males.

The median income for a household in the county was $27,025, and the median income for a family was $32,772. Males had a median income of $28,395 versus $18,925 for females. The per capita income for the county was $15,548.  About 15.60% of families and 21.20% of the population were below the poverty line, including 30.70% of those under age 18 and 20.10% of those age 65 or over.

Politics

At the presidential level, San Augustine County has voted for the Republican candidate in every election since 2000, having usually been carried by Democratic candidates up until that point.

Like many areas of the South, while Republicans generally win federal and state elections, Democrats tend to perform better in down-ballot races for local offices. Identification with the Democratic Party is strong in San Augustine County. In 2012, roughly 24 percent of eligible voters participated in the Democratic primary, while less than 6 percent participated in the Republican primary, despite there being a competitive presidential primary on the Republican ballot.

Elected officials
At the Federal level, San Augustine County is part of the 1st Congressional District, which is currently represented by Louie Gohmert, a Republican from Tyler.

In the Texas Legislature, the county is represented by State Representative Trent Ashby (R-Lufkin), and by State Senator Robert Nichols (R-Jacksonville).

Communities
 Black Ankle
 Benina
 Broaddus
 San Augustine (county seat)

Education
School districts:
 Broaddus Independent School District
 Brookeland Independent School District
 Chireno Independent School District
 San Augustine Independent School District

The county is in the service area of Angelina College.

In popular culture

American photographer John Vachon took a series of photographs of rural schoolchildren in San Augustine County, Texas, for the Farm Security Administration in 1943.

See also
 National Register of Historic Places listings in San Augustine County, Texas
 Recorded Texas Historic Landmarks in San Augustine County

References

External links

 San Augustine County government's website
 
 San Augustine County Collection at the Autry National Center
 

 
1837 establishments in the Republic of Texas
Populated places established in 1837